Darren Stride (born 28 September 1975) is an English former professional association football footballer.

Playing as a central defender or in other utility roles including centre forward, Stride captained the Burton Albion side for 12 years.

Stride has recently completed his coaching qualifications and is looking to move into management.

Career
Stride had been part of the first team since progressing from the Burton youth team, and had subsequently become the club's record holder for most appearances. He had also played in every single position during his time at the club, including as an emergency goalkeeper.

Stride was released at the end of the 2009–10 after 17 years with the club. He subsequently joined Alfreton Town on a one-year deal in August 2010. Stride captained Alfreton on his debut, a 1–0 win against Hinckley United. Stride and Alfreton Town went on to win the Conference North however he was released at the end of the season, after which he signed for Chasetown.

Stride made 23 appearances for Chasetown, scoring one goal, before leaving the club in 2012.

Honours
with Burton Albion
Northern Premier League: 2002
Conference National: 2009

with Alfreton Town
Conference North: 2011

References

External links 
 
 Squad Member Profile - Darren Stride at BurtonAlbionFC.co.uk

1975 births
Living people
Sportspeople from Burton upon Trent
English footballers
Association football defenders
Burton Albion F.C. players
Alfreton Town F.C. players
Chasetown F.C. players
National League (English football) players
English Football League players
Northern Premier League players
Southern Football League players
Outfield association footballers who played in goal